Ethelton may refer to:

Ethelton, South Australia, a suburb of Adelaide, South Australia
Ethelton railway station, which services Ethelton, South Australia
Ethelton Football Club, one of three Australian rules football clubs that merged to form Portland Football Club (South Australia)